Dustin Blake McDaniel (born April 29, 1972) is an American lawyer and politician who served as the 55th Attorney General of Arkansas from 2007 to 2015. A member of the Democratic Party, he a founding partner of the Little Rock, Arkansas law firm McDaniel Wolff, PLLC. , McDaniel is the last Democrat to have held the position of Arkansas Attorney General.

McDaniel's practice focuses on Attorneys General investigations, consumer protection and administrative law issues, multi-state litigation, antitrust laws, tobacco laws, gaming laws, Medicaid fraud and digital privacy laws. He is licensed in Arkansas as well as the District of Columbia and enjoys a national law practice representing individuals and some of America’s largest law firms and corporations. His clients’ business fields range from healthcare to technology, as well as within regulated industries such as tobacco and medical cannabis. McDaniel assists his clients with their interactions with State Attorneys General from both parties, Governors and Arkansas state government. He has also assisted other attorneys general with preparing for SCOTUS arguments.

Early life and education 
Dustin McDaniel was born in Fayetteville, Arkansas. He is the oldest son of Bobby McDaniel and Melody Gammon Konnerth. McDaniel has one sibling, Brett Anthony McDaniel, who is an attorney in Jonesboro, Arkansas. His father, Bobby, graduated from the University of Arkansas School of Law after Dustin was born. Mike Beebe, the 45th Governor of Arkansas, was a fellow law student and friend of the family.

McDaniel attended Jonesboro Public Schools, graduating from Jonesboro High School in 1990. He attended the University of Arkansas at Fayetteville, where he was a student at the Sam M. Walton College of Business. He is a member of the Xi Chapter Kappa Sigma fraternity and the President of the Interfraternity Council. He graduated with a Bachelor's of Science in Public Administration in 1994.

In 1996, McDaniel enrolled at the University of Arkansas at Little Rock's William H. Bowen School of Law. During his time at Bowen, he was elected Honor Council Prosecutor and served as Assistant Articles Editor for the UALR Law Review. After two and a half years, he graduated cum laude with his Juris Doctor in January 1999. McDaniel continues to serve on the law school's Dean's Advisory Council.

Career

Jonesboro Police Department

After college, McDaniel joined the Jonesboro Police Department (JPD) in Jonesboro, Arkansas. He attended the Arkansas Law Enforcement Training Academy (ALETA) in Camden, Arkansas. He is a graduate of ALETA Class 94-D. He served as a full-time patrolman with JPD from 1994 to 1996. From 1996 to 2000, he served as a part-time uniformed officer while attending law school. From 2000 to present, McDaniel has been assigned to the Department's Training Division as a Part-Time Category II member of the force.

In 1998, a mass school shooting in Jonesboro, Arkansas at Westside Middle School killed 4 students and 1 teacher and wounded 10 other students.

McDaniel saw the news breaking on CNN and drove to Jonesboro to report for duty and go to the scene. He spoke of it often in his public life. McDaniel's father, Bobby McDaniel, filed suit on behalf of the families of the dead against the shooters and the manufacturers of the firearms used. The suit was filed before Dustin McDaniel had a law license, but nonetheless it was used by former Senator Gunner DeLay in 2006 as evidence of McDaniel's lack of trustworthiness on Second Amendment Issues. McDaniel fought back by touting his law enforcement background and that he was an avid hunter. In 2017, the families were awarded an uncollectible judgment of $150 million against Andrew Golden and Mitchell Johnson.

Private practice

After law school, McDaniel joined his father's law firm, McDaniel & Wells, P.A. (now McDaniel Law Firm) in Jonesboro, Arkansas. He remained at McDaniel & Wells, P.A. from 1999-2007.

McDaniel received several awards during his private practice career, including a Golden Gavel Award from the Arkansas Bar Association for serving as Chair of the Consumer Law Handbook Committee in 2000 and a Distinguished Service Award from the Arkansas Bar Association for overseeing the Consumer Law Handbook's translation into Spanish in 2001. He also received the UALR William H. Bowen School of Law Young Alumnus Award in 2002. In the same year, he was appointed to the Arkansas Bar Association Law School Committee and admitted into the Million Dollar Advocates Forum. In 2003, McDaniel was the only attorney in Arkansas to serve on the Legislation committees of both the Arkansas Bar Association and the Arkansas Trial Lawyers Association.

McDaniel served as Legal Counsel for Craighead County Democratic Central Committee and as a member of the Democratic Party of Arkansas State Committee from 2002-2005.

Under Arkansas law, the Attorney General is prohibited from engaging in the private practice of law. McDaniel left McDaniel & Wells, P.A. in January 2007 and formed McDaniel, Richardson & Calhoun, PLLC in 2015 after he was term limited.

In 2019, the UALR William H. Bowen School of Law presented him with its Distinguished Alumnus Award.

Arkansas House of Representatives 
On July 1, 2003, McDaniel announced his candidacy for the 75th District Arkansas House of Representatives. The 75th District encompassed the metropolitan Jonesboro area. His primary opponent was veteran and school administrator Paul House. After securing the Democratic primary, McDaniel went on to face Billie Sue Hoggard (R) in the general election. McDaniel won, receiving 53% of votes. In that same election, President George W. Bush (R) defeated Sen. John Kerry (D) 53% to 46% in Arkansas House District 75 (Craighead County).

May 18, 2004 Democratic Primary Results

November 2, 2004 General Election Results

McDaniel was sworn into the 85th Arkansas General Assembly in January 2005. From 2005-2007, he served on the House Public Health, Welfare and Labor Committee. While serving his one term, he authored and passed complicated and controversial legislation, including bills regarding Tax Increment Financing (TIF) and establishing a prescription drug program for working, uninsured Arkansans called “Arkansas Rx,” which was never fully implemented.

During his term, McDaniel was the only freshman named to the Top Ten Legislators list by the Arkansas Democrat-Gazette. He was also appointed Co-Chair of the Joint Select Committee on Health Insurance and Prescription Drugs.

55th Attorney General of Arkansas 
On June 29, 2005, McDaniel announced his candidacy for Attorney General. He faced two primary opponents, Paul Suskie and Robert Leo Herzfeld. During the campaign, 16 former Presidents of the Arkansas Bar Association endorsed McDaniel, as well as former State Treasurer and 2002 Democratic Candidate for Governor, Jimmie Lou Fisher, who served as McDaniel's campaign chair.

Democratic Primary, 2006

Democratic Primary Run-off, 2006

In the general election, McDaniel faced two opponents, Republican candidate former State Senator Gunner DeLay and Green Party candidate attorney Rebekah Kennedy. McDaniel won his bid for Attorney General. When McDaniel was sworn in at the age of 34, he became the youngest Attorney General in the nation.

November 7, 2006 General Election Results

First term

During his first term as Attorney General, McDaniel expanded consumer protection litigation, Medicaid fraud enforcement and established the Arkansas Attorney General's Office as a law enforcement agency. He also instigated the "Be Street Smart" Program to raise consumer awareness of scams and cybercrimes.

McDaniel reorganized the Criminal Department of the Attorney General's Office to better address an increase in case load of habeas corpus and 1983 civil rights cases brought by or on behalf of death row inmates.

In 2007, McDaniel helped resolve Lake View School District No. 25 v. Huckabee, a fifteen-year-old case filed by the Lake View School District that examined the structure for the funding of Arkansas schools. This case led to the subsequent overhaul of public school funding with the aim to be more fair and exact and to benefit all Arkansas students equally. McDaniel worked closely with legislators during his first two years as Attorney General, and in April 2006, the Arkansas General Assembly passed legislation that gave the public schools additional funding, and the special masters’ final report in 2007 was positive, leading the court to declare the funding program for education to be constitutional. Through a final series of reforms, the Lake View School District was consolidated with the Barton-Lexa School District.

McDaniel demanded that payday lenders in Arkansas shut down or face legal action, ordering nearly 156 outlets shut down and stating: "In addition, I hereby demand you void any and all current and past-due obligations of your borrowers, and refrain from any collection activities related to these payday loans". More than $7 million was awarded through litigation on behalf of payday loan customers.

In 2009, after a year debate and discussion between agriculture advocates and animal welfare organizations, McDaniel brokered a successful bill to address animal cruelty. The bill, SB 77, called for a felony charge of aggravated animal cruelty for a first offense when committed against a dog, cat, or horse. The bill defined animal cruelty as mistreating an animal, killing or injuring an animal that is not your own, abandonment, starvation, failure to provide adequate shelter, or dragging an animal behind a vehicle. SB 77 included stiffer penalties when the abuse is committed in front of a child, increased penalties for subsequent misdemeanor charges (the fourth misdemeanor charge would result in a felony) and required psychological evaluations for offenders. The bill also outlawed all animal fighting as at the time, only dog fighting was illegal. The bill became Act 33 of 2009.

McDaniel passed legislation empowering the Attorney General's Office as the statewide law enforcement agency, allowing for the creation for a cyber division that pursued online sex offenders.

Second term

McDaniel was unopposed in the 2010 Democratic Party Primary. During the general election, he again faced Green Party candidate Rebekah Kennedy. McDaniel easily defended his seat, capturing 72.8% of the vote to secure a second term. 

During his second term, McDaniel became the first Arkansas Attorney General to argue before the U.S. Supreme Court in nearly 16 years, successfully arguing the State's position in Blueford v. Arkansas'' (2012).

The term also included multiple settlements he procured on behalf of the State of Arkansas. In March 2013, McDaniel announced an arbitration panel issued a ruling that allowed a settlement to proceed between Arkansas and the tobacco companies that signed the 1998 Master Settlement Agreement. Arkansas received the entire amount of settlement money that was in escrow, which amounted to $22.7 million. That November, McDaniel successfully negotiated a settlement agreement with North Little Rock School District, Pulaski County Special School District, and the Little Rock School District that phased out millions in ongoing, annual desegregation payments. The state would pay the districts $65.8 million for four years with the final year's funds used only for construction of academic facilities. In January 2014, U.S. District Judge D. Price Marshall accepted the agreement.

Positions held as Attorney General 
  National Association of Attorneys General's Southern Region, Chairman (2009-2011)
  National Association of Attorneys General's Tobacco Committee, Co-chairman (2009-2013)
  National Association of Attorneys General's Energy and Environment Committee, Co-chairman (2013-2014)
  Democratic Attorneys General Association, Co-chairman (2009-2011)
  Democratic Attorneys General Association's DNC representative (2009-2013)
  State chair of Hillary Clinton's 2008 presidential campaign
 Rodel Fellow, The Aspen Institute  (2007–Present)
In June 2012, McDaniel filed paperwork to start raising money for his 2014 campaign for Governor of Arkansas. In the first six months, McDaniel raised over $1.5 million. Early polling showed McDaniel as an overwhelming favorite for the Democratic nomination. However, in 2010 and 2012, Republicans took over Arkansas politics and early polling showed McDaniel as a long shot against Republican opponent Asa Hutchinson. After admitting to “an inappropriate relationship” with a Hot Springs attorney, McDaniel withdrew from the race in January 2013.

After McDaniel's withdrawal, former Congressman Mike Ross entered for the Democratic nomination. In 2014, Asa Hutchinson defeated Mike Ross to become the 46th Governor of Arkansas.

Return to private practice 
After being term-limited in January 2015, McDaniel founded McDaniel, Richardson & Calhoun, PLLC (MRC) in Little Rock, Arkansas with partners Scott Richardson and Bart Calhoun. Richardson served as Senior Assistant Attorney General overseeing state agency compliance and complex litigation including education matters. Calhoun was the Assistant Attorney General working on matters of public protection, bankruptcy and consumer litigation.

McDaniel's clients include some of America's largest corporations, technology, internet, telecommunications, health insurance, healthcare providers, tobacco, and intellectual property companies.

In 2020, MRC began a series of mergers with other law firms and now operates as McDaniel Wolff, PLLC.

McDaniel is the national co-chair of the Society of Attorneys General Emeritus (SAGE) and serves on the board of trustees of the Central Arkansas Library System.

Personal life 
McDaniel married Amanda Gail Miller McDaniel in 1996. They have one daughter, Emma Grace McDaniel (b. 2001). Dustin and Amanda divorced in 2008.

On June 12, 2009, McDaniel married Bobbi Pualani Fowler. Bobbi had two children from a prior marriage, Chris Eugene “C.J.” Fowler, Jr. (b. 1999) and Alexandra Rose Fowler (b. 2001). Bobbi currently works as Development Director of the Arkansas Hunger Relief Alliance.

McDaniel is an avid sportsman, with a passion for Arkansas duck hunting and South Dakota pheasant hunting. He also has his pilot's license.

McDaniel is a distinguished member of the legal community in Arkansas, and he is active in a number of professional, public service and charitable organizations. He serves on several boards, including Our House, a homeless shelter in Little Rock; University of Arkansas Alumni Association National Board of Directors; and, the Democratic Party of Arkansas Executive Committee as the Democratic National Committeeman.

References

External links 
 ArkansasAG.gov - Official Website

1972 births
American municipal police officers
American prosecutors
Arkansas Attorneys General
Living people
Democratic Party members of the Arkansas House of Representatives
Politicians from Fayetteville, Arkansas
University of Arkansas alumni